Pathiyankara is a small village in Alappuzha district, Kerala, India. There is a mosque where hundreds of people comes to pray every day.

Pathiyankara is very near to both Kayamkulam and the Arabian sea. Pathiyankara is a small place in Thrikkunnapuzha village. People of this village are engaged mostly in Coir works, Fishing  and other jobs. There are several temples in Pathiyankara  named as Mootheril Temple, Ammumma Nada Temple, Kaliyamma Temple And Muriyaalil Temple. Some part of Pathiyankara are islands. These islands are connected to the main land by a bridge across Kayamkulam Kayal. The main source of transportation is road ways and water ways.

References

Villages in Alappuzha district